Garrel or Garrels is a surname. Notable people with the surname include:

Garrel
Esther Garrel (born 1991), French actress
Louis Garrel (born 1983), French actor and filmmaker
Maurice Garrel (1923–2011), French actor
Philippe Garrel (born 1948), French film director and screenwriter

Van Garrel
Betty van Garrel (1939–2020), Dutch journalist and writer

Garrels
Anne Garrels (born 1951), long-time foreign correspondent for National Public Radio in the United States
John Garrels (1885–1956), American athlete in running, discus throw, shot put, and as a fullback and end in American football
Josh Garrels (born 1980), American singer-songwriter, producer, and composer
Robert Garrels (1916–1988), American geochemist

See also
Garrel Burgoon (1900–1970), American businessman and politician